Nicole Eisenman (born 1965) is French-born American artist known for her oil paintings and sculptures. She has been awarded the Guggenheim Fellowship (1996), the Carnegie Prize (2013), and has thrice been included in the Whitney Biennial (1995, 2012, 2019). On September 29, 2015, she won a MacArthur Fellowship award for "restoring the representation of the human form a cultural significance that had waned during the ascendancy of abstraction in the 20th century."

Eisenman lives in Brooklyn.

Biography
Nicole Eisenman was born in 1965 in Verdun, France where her father was stationed as an army psychiatrist. She is of German-Jewish descent; her great-grandmother was Esther Hamerman, a Polish-born painter.

In 1970, Eisenman's family moved from France to Scarsdale, New York, where she spent her childhood. She attended the Rhode Island School of Design, graduating with a B.F.A in painting in 1987. She then moved to New York City.

Between 2003 and 2009, Eisenman taught at Bard College in Annandale-on-Hudson.

Work

Eisenman's figurative oil paintings often toy with themes of sexuality, comedy, and caricature. Though she is known for her paintings, the artist also creates installations, drawings, etchings, lithography, monotypes, woodcuts, and sculptures. With A.L. Steiner, she is the co-founder of the queer/feminist curatorial initiative Ridykeulous. Eisenman's work was included in the 2022 exhibition Women Painting Women at the Modern Art Museum of Fort Worth.

Sculpture
Eisenman also works in creating whimsical sculptures that have been shown at the 58th Venice Biennale, 2017 Skulptur Projekte Münster, and the 2019 Whitney Biennial. Eisenman began working on Sketch for a Fountain in 2012, a bronze piece acquired by the Nasher Sculpture Center in 2019. The acquisition was funded by the Kaleta A. Doolin Acquisitions Fund for Women Artists and the Green Family Collection.

Exhibitions 
 Nicole Eisenman, Kunsthalle Zürich (2007)
 Matrix 248, Berkeley Art Museum (2013)
 Dear Nemesis, Nicole Eisenman 1993–2013, Contemporary Art Museum St. Louis (2014).
 Dear Nemesis: Nicole Eisenman 1993–2013, Institute of Contemporary Art, Philadelphia (2014).
 Masterpieces & Curiosities: Nicole Eisenman’s Seder (2015), The Jewish Museum
 Nicole Eisenman: Al-ugh-ories, New Museum (2016)
 Nicole Eisenman: Dark Light, Secession, Vienna, Austria (2017)
Baden Baden Baden, Staatliche Kunsthalle Bade-Baden (2019)
Nicole Eisenman: Sturm und Drang, The Contemporary Austin, Austin
Nicole Eisenman: Giant Without a Body, Astrup Fearnley Museet, Oslo, Norway

Recognition
Eisenman has been awarded numerous grants and prizes including the Guggenheim Fellowship (1996), the Carnegie Prize (2013), the Anonymous Was a Woman Award (2014) and the Louis Comfort Tiffany Grant (1995). She was also the recipient of a 2015 MacArthur Fellowship. Also in 2015, she was named as one of The Forward 50.

Collections
The artist's work can be found in a number of institutions, including:
 Art Institute of Chicago
 Museum of Modern Art, New York
 San Francisco Museum of Modern Art
 Walker Art Center, Minneapolis
 Whitney Museum of American Art, New York
 Kunsthalle Zürich
 The Jewish Museum, New York
Smithsonian American Art Museum
Museum of Contemporary Art, Los Angeles
Nasher Sculpture Center

Art market
Eisenman is represented by Hauser & Wirth (since 2019), Anton Kern, and Vielmetter Los Angeles. She previously worked with Galerie Barbara Weiss.

Personal life
Eisenman is a lesbian. In a 2016 interview with The New York Times Eisenman said of her gender identity, "I’m gender fluid, but I use the “she” pronoun. I believe in the radicality of stretching the definition of what 'she' is." Eisenman uses both "she/her" and "they/them" pronouns.

Bibliography
 Nicole Eisenman: Behavior (Rice Gallery, 1998)
 Nicole Eisenman: Selected works 1993–2003 (Herbert F. Johnson Museum of Art, 2003)
 Nicole Eisenman: Selected Works 1994–2004 ed. Victor Mathieu (Walther König, 2008)
 Nicole Eisenman: The Way We Weren't (Frances Young Tang Teaching Museum and Art Gallery, 2010)
 Nicole Eisenman ed. Beatrix Ruf (JRP-Ringier, 2011)
 Parkett no. 91 (Parkett Verlag, 2012)
 Nicole Eisenman: Dear Nemesis, 1993–2013 (Contemporary Art Museum St. Louis/Walther König, 2014)

References

External links
 Nicole Eisenman and David Humphrey  Bomb
 Nicole Eisenman in the collection of The Museum of Modern Art
 Nicole Eisenman at the Carnegie International

1965 births
Living people
Rhode Island School of Design alumni
Feminist artists
20th-century American painters
American lesbian artists
American LGBT painters
Lesbian painters
American women painters
Painters from New York (state)
Bard College faculty
Scarsdale High School alumni
20th-century American women artists
MacArthur Fellows
Lesbian Jews
21st-century American painters
21st-century American women artists
Jewish American artists
American women academics
21st-century American Jews
Members of the American Academy of Arts and Letters
Genderfluid people